Universidad de Zamboanga (UZ) is a private  nonsectarian coeducational higher education institution in Zamboanga City, Philippines, founded on October 12, 1948, by Engr. Arturo Eustaquio, Sr. It was formerly known as Zamboanga A.E. Colleges until it changed its name to Universidad de Zamboanga on the 11th day of April 2005, the day it was granted university status.

UZ holds approximately 20% of all college enrollment in region-IX Western Mindanao. It has seven campuses spread out in an area of more than 120 hectares in and outside of the city. These campuses include the Main Campus in Barangay Tetuan, City Campus, Cabatangan Campus, Pasonanca Campus, IHK Veterans Campus, High School Campus in Gov. Alvarez St. Barangay Zone-III, Pagadian Campus in Barangay Tiguma Pagadian City, Zamboanga del Sur and the Ipil Campus in Poblacion Ipil, Zamboanga Sibugay. UZ has two high schools: the Arturo Eustaquio Memorial Science High School and the UZ Technical High School which also offers Senior High School.

The university uses its official name in Spanish and Chavacano languages.

History

1948 - Engineer Arturo Francisco Eustaquio founded the Zamboanga Arturo Eustaquio Colleges (ZAEC), and opened its doors to 479 high school and college students. Classes were held at the former Mendoza Building, where Young Mart is now located.  
ZAEC initially offered a complete academic Secondary Course, Bachelor of Science in Education (BSE), Liberal Arts (AB) and Bachelor of Science in Commerce (BSC).

1949 - First High School graduation 
ZAEC’s Complete Academic Secondary Course was given government recognition. There was a tremendous increase in enrollment and to accommodate the enrollees, ZAEC left the Mendoza Building and moved to its new home (its present location), the main campus in barangay Tetuan.

1951 - Bachelor of Laws was offered and phased out in 1996.

1955 - Bachelor of Arts (AB) with majors in English, Filipino, History earned government recognition.

1956 - A one-year course in Pre-Nursing (up to the summer of '79) and Graduate Course in Education M.A. were offered, which lasted up to 1962 and were offered again in 1969. A one-year Secretarial course was initially offered.

1969 - Bachelor of Science in Civil Engineering (BSCE) and Bachelor of Science in Chemical Engineering (BSChe) were first offered.

1970 - Bachelor of Science in Medical Technology (BSMT) were first offered.

1974 - Bachelor of Science in Civil Engineering (BSCE) earned government recognition.

1975 - Bachelor of Science in Medical Technology (BSMT) earned government recognition.  
Master in Business Administration (MBA) was offered.

1976 - Bachelor of Science in Secretarial Administration (BSSA) and Bachelor of Science in Criminology (BS Crim) were first offered.

1977 - Graduate course in Master of Arts in Education (MA) was given government recognition. Masters in Public Administration (MPA) and Associate in Criminology were given government recognition.

1978 - Master of Arts in Education major in Filipino was offered.

1979 - Bachelor of Science in Chemical Engineering (BSCHE) and Master in Business Administration (MBA) earned government recognition.
Bachelor of Science in Agriculture Technology (BAT) was first offered. Bachelor of Science in Secretarial Administration (BSSA) earned government recognition.  
Two-year course in Junior Secretarial Administration (BSSA) with majors in Computer Secretarial and Office Management earned government recognition.

1982 - Bachelor of Science in Criminology (BS Criminology) earned government recognition.

1984 - Bachelor of Science in Agricultural Business (BSAB) was offered.  
An Agricultural Technology (2 years) earned government recognition.  
Master in Public Administration (MPA) earned government recognition.

1990- Bachelor of Science in Accountancy (BSA) was first offered.  
Bachelor of Science in Agricultural Business (BSAB) earned government recognition.  
Bachelor of Science in Accountancy (BSA) earned government recognition.

1991 - Two-Year Course in Respiratory therapy and Three-Year Associate in Radiologic Technology were first offered.  
The ZAEC Community Medical Center opened its doors for the first time.
ZAEC academic High School was temporarily closed and converted to ZAEC Technical High School.
ZAEC Technical High School opened with an initial enrollment of 50 first year students. It emphasizes the teaching of technical skills to its students.  
Three-Year Associate in Radiologic Technology (ART) earned government Recognition.  
Dental Technology, Bachelor of Science in Computer Engineering (BSCOE) and Bachelor of Science in Electronics and Communications Engineering (BSECE) were offered.

1992 - Doctor in Education was offered.  
Bachelor of Science in Respiratory Therapy (BSRT) were first offered.  
Two-Year course in Respiratory Therapy earned government recognition. 
Bachelor of Science in Pharmacy was offered.  
Two-Year Dental Technology earned government recognition.

1995 - Master in Library Science was offered.

1997 - Master of Science in Criminology was first offered.  
ZAEC NetAccess partnered with Moscom Manila to be an Internet Provider in Zamboanga City.  
Bachelor of Science in Computer Engineering (BSCoE) and Associate in Computer Engineering earned government recognition.  
Bachelor of Science in Radiologic Technology was offered.  
Bachelor of Science in Pharmacy and Bachelor of Science in Radiologic Technology earned government recognition.  
Master of Science in Criminology earned government recognition.  
Bachelor of Science in Elementary Education earned government recognition.

1999 - The Summit Centre, a fully air conditioned multi-purpose sport arena with a seating capacity of 10,000 was inaugurated.  
Hosted the first PBA game held here in Zamboanga City at THE SUMMIT CENTRE.

2000 - The Criminology Academy training ground in Cabatangan Campus was established.  
CISCO System, Inc. tie-up with ZAEC through the CISCO Networking Academy Program to develop highly skilled workforce 
Information Communications Technology (ICT) was then offered.

2002 - ZAEC extended its doors to more students in Mindanao by opening ZAEC Ipil. Which is 136 kilometers of Zamboanga City.

2003 - The Certification International (CI) formally granted ISO:9001-2000 Certification to ZAEC Educational Support Services, the first Higher Education Institution accredited of such prestige in the whole of Western Mindanao. Driven by its quest to provide quality services, ZAEC continued improving its processes that resulted in the migration from ISO PNS 9001:2000, ISO 9001:2008 to ISO 9001:2015 respectively as recognized by the SOCOTEC Certification International.

2005 - April 11, 2005, CHED grants ZAEC its University Status and changed its name to Universidad de Zamboanga.

2014 - UZ established another branch at Pagadian City in Barangay Tiguma to cater to the Zamboanga del Sur region. It offered three (3) of its flagship programs in Allied Medicine, namely; Bachelor of Science in Medical Technology, Bachelor of Science in Nursing, and Bachelor of Science in Pharmacy.
 April 23, 2014, the Department of Education provisional permit was granted for Universidad de Zamboanga to offer the program as a stand-alone Senior High School to include the Ipil Branch and the Technical High School.

2017 - Universidad de Zamboanga clinched the Hall of Famer Award for Energy Leadership - Tertiary Level. This prestigious award recognizes institutions that promote practices and initiatives in electrical safety, energy efficiency, and conservation. 

2020 - April 2, 2020, UZ was recognized as the first Investors in People (IIP) accredited university in Visayas and Mindanao, a standard for people management. In the same year, the university was shortlisted as a Top-8 finalist for Employer of the Year and Top-5 Community Person of the Year for the nominated employee.

2021 - July 1, 2021, attained its 2nd International Organization for Standardization (ISO) certification standard-- The ISO 45001:2018 Occupational Health and Safety Management System.

2022 - February 26, 2022, awarded as the Top Academe (Institutional) in the 85th Dia de Zamboanga Local Achievers Award 
 April 9, 2022, earned its first PACUCOA Level-III accredited status for the Master of Arts in Education (MAED)
 July 19, 2022, recognized as the Outstanding Higher Education Institutions (HEI) for the COVID-19 Vaccination Program by CHED
 September 14, 2022, recognized as Investors In People - Silver

External links
Universidad de Zamboanga official website

Universities and colleges in the Philippines
Higher education in the Philippines